Jeff Cannata is an American, Connecticut-based musician, songwriter, and record producer. Cannata was a founding member and driving force behind the New Haven-based, progressive rock band Jasper Wrath. He was the drummer for the group, however he also sang, played woodwinds, and wrote a majority of the songs on their 1971 self-titled debut album. The band retained a local following and continued touring until they disbanded in 1976.

Cannata formed a new project called Arc Angel in 1983, with former Jasper Wrath bandmate Michael Soldan. The group signed a record deal with CBS Records and released a self-titled debut in 1983. In Arc Angel, Cannata was the frontman as he sang and played guitar. He later made a number of solo albums under the name Cannata. These included Images of Forever (CBS Records, 1988) and Watching the World (1993).

Jeff Cannata produces several local bands in the Connecticut area and manages the independent record label Oxford Circus Records. He released a new album with Arc Angel in 2002, followed by a new solo album, Mysterium Magnum in 2006.

Discography

Jasper Wrath
Jasper Wrath (1971)
You / General Gunther (single) (1975)
Coming Back (1977) [credited as Arden House]
Zoldar & Clark (1977) [credited as Zoldar & Clark]
Anthology: 1969–1976 (1996)

Arc Angel
Arc Angel (1983)
Tamorok (2002)
Harlequins of Light (2013)

Cannata
Images of Forever (1988)
Watching The World (1993)
Tamorok (2002)
Mysterium Magnum (2006)
My Back Pages: Volume 1 (2009)

References

External links
 Jeff Cannata's official website

Living people
American rock drummers
American rock singers
American male singer-songwriters
American rock songwriters
Place of birth missing (living people)
Year of birth missing (living people)
Singer-songwriters from New York (state)
Singer-songwriters from Connecticut